Johnny Ned Nusunginya (March 13, 1927 – August 18, 1981) (Last name pronounced like Nusaŋiña in Iñupiaq) was an American politician from the state of Alaska. He served in the Alaska House of Representatives from 1959 to 1963 as a Democrat.

An Iñupiaq, he was born in Utqiagvik, Alaska in 1927 and worked as a carpenter. He also owned a delivery service business in Utqiagvik, where he also served as mayor as well as director of civil defense. At the time of his election to the House in 1958, he was married and had six children. In his election platform, he stated that "non-discrimination" was an integral part of his reasoning to stand as a candidate, and that as a lifetime resident of Northern Alaska, he was "in the position to understand the problems of the natives in Alaska", stressing the need for progress for those groups.

On February 3, 1961, four people including Nusunginya's wife, Vera (née Bolt), along with his six-year-old son and brother-in-law were killed in a fire at the family home in Utqiagvik. Another infant, a child of Nusinginya's, was rescued by a bystander who rushed in take the child from the burning home; he was the sole survivor of the house fire, which had occurred in temperatures that measured . Apparently caused due to an explosion of an oil stove, the fire transpired while his other six children were at school; thus they were unharmed. In May 1961, Nusunginya was arrested and charged by the United States Fish and Wildlife Service for hunting eider ducks out of season, which prompted protest from about 138 other Iñupiat, who presented 600 pounds of ducks to game wardens in the area in an act of civil disobedience, an unprecedented stand in solidarity by the Iñupiat people up until that time. The charges were later dropped.

Nusunginya died on August 18, 1981 in Anchorage, from heart failure.

References

1927 births
1981 deaths
American carpenters
Inupiat people
Democratic Party members of the Alaska House of Representatives
Native American state legislators in Alaska
People from Utqiagvik, Alaska
20th-century American politicians